The Renault Primaquatre is an automobile produced from 1931 to 1941 by Renault, the last car built before Louis Renault's death in 1944.

First Generation
The Primaquatre was first exhibited on 29 December 1930 as the Type KZ6, being a development from to the KZ series. The rear wheels were driven via an unsynchronised 3-speed manual transmission.

In 1932 arrived the new model Type KZ8 more width to difference of the Renault Monaquatre.
In 1933 the KZ11 appeared, was a taxis G7 company, a special series of 2400 vehicles with new adaptations.

Second generation

In following years the types ACL2, BDF1, BDF2 and BDS1 were introduced, and were produced until the early summer of 1940 when the unexpected speed of the German invasion put an end to most passenger car production in France.  Two changes towards the end of 1937 were the introduction of Renault's newly developed mechanical brake servo, as well as the removal of one of the two access points for the fuel tank which from now on had to be filled using a single fuel filler on the right hand side of the rear panel.

One final technical enhancement came in 1940 when Lockheed hydraulic brakes replaced the cable brakes specified for the original design.

Types
First generation:
KZ6
KZ8
KZ10
KZ11
KZ18
KZ24

Second generation:
ACL1
ACL2
BDF1
BDF2
BDS1
BDS2

Characteristics
Speed: 
Brakes: with cables on drums AV and AR
Battery: 6 V

Sources

Primaquatre
Cars introduced in 1931